Palandha Pathirage Lakshman Calistus Dias, popularly as Lucky Dias (ලකී ඩයස් born 5 February 1949), is an actor in Sri Lankan cinema and teledrama as well as a producer and director.He entered films in 1986 guided by his mentor, a famous actor and film director, Gamini Fonseka. He did the first hosting of Obada Lakshapathi Mamada Lakshapathi, Sri Lankan version of Who Wants to Be a Millionaire?. On 12 June 1986, he married Malini Fonseka, Sri Lankan film actress and divorced in 2011. He got the Presidential Film Award in 1998.

Filmography
 No. denotes the Number of Sri Lankan film in the Sri Lankan cinema.

Television serials
 Bharyawo
 Eha Ivura
 Iqbal as Imran
 Kemmura
 Kulawamiya
 Magi
 Miriguwen Eha'''
 Muthu Ataye Modayo Nannadunanni Sahas Gaw Dura as Sampath
 Sankranthi Samaya Shaun Seethala Gini Del Sihina Sithuvam 
 Sive Diya Dahara 
 Sohayuro as Mahendra
 Sulangata Mediwi Suwanda Obai Amme Swetha Gantheera Wassa Nuba Wage Yashorawaya as Baladeva
 Yes Boss as Nihal Kariyawasam

ProducerParadeesey (1991)Sathya (1992)Anthima Reya (1998)

Directed films and tv serialsSeethala Gini Dal (2016)Breaking News (upcoming)Sannasi Premaya. It is the first teledrama to be filmed by a smartphone in Sri Lanka.Katharaka HasareliSuwanda Obai AmmeSivdiya DaharaSanda TharakaSasara Ivuru 

AnnouncerObada Lakshapathi Mamada Lakshapathi'' (2010)

References

External links

Malini Fonseka Online.com
අමුතුම තාලේ චරිත හයක්

ලකී ඩයස් ඉතිහාසයට එක්වෙයි

Living people
Sri Lankan male film actors
Who Wants to Be a Millionaire?
Sinhalese male actors
Sri Lankan male television actors
1951 births